Rum Ragged are a Canadian folk music group from Newfoundland and Labrador. They are most noted for their 2020 album The Thing About Fish, which was a shortlisted Juno Award nominee for Traditional Roots Album of the Year at the Juno Awards of 2021.

Originally consisting of accordionist Aaron Collis and singer/guitarist Mark Manning, the band released its self-titled debut album in 2016. They followed up with the album The Hard Times and a holiday-themed album titled Rum Ragged at Christmas in 2018, with new supporting members Anthony Chafe on bodhran and Michael Boone on bass and banjo. Chafe and Boone were subsequently replaced by fiddler Colin Grant and multi-instrumentalist Zack Nash in early 2019. 

In addition to their Juno Award nomination, the band received two Canadian Folk Music Award nominations, including for New/Emerging Artist of the Year at the 16th Canadian Folk Music Awards. They have been nominated for several East Coast Music Awards, and won ten MusicNL awards in their time as a band.

Discography

Studio Albums
Rum Ragged (2016)
The Hard Times (2018)
Rum Ragged at Christmas (2018)
The Thing About Fish (2020)

References

External links

 Canadian folk music groups
 Musical groups from Newfoundland and Labrador